The Spiritual Baptist faith is a religion created by persons of African ancestry in the plantations they came to in the former British West Indies countries predominantly in the islands of a Grenada, Saint Vincent and the Grenadines, Tobago and the Virgin Islands. It is syncretic Afro-Caribbean religion that combines elements of the many varied traditional African religions brought by the enslaved populations combined with Christianity. Spiritual Baptists consider themselves to be Christians.

The Baptist faith has a different beginning in the nation of Trinidad, as unlike the spiritual baptist tradition in the other countries where the religion developed in the plantations where the enslaved were sent, the religion in Trinidad was brought into the country by the Merikins, former American slaves who were recruited by the British to fight, as the Corps of Colonial Marines, against the Americans during the War of 1812. After the end of the war, these ex-slaves were settled in Trinidad, to the east of the Mission of Savannah Grande (now known as Princes Town) in six villages, since then called the Company Villages.

These American settlers brought with them the Baptist faith of the Second Great Awakening combined with, in the case of those from Georgia, the Gullah culture. With the coming of missionaries of the Baptist Missionary Society from Great Britain, the Baptist faith in the Company Villages was much affected, but despite the ensuing schism between the so-called London Baptists and the rest, the Baptist congregations of the Company Villages, even including those with Gullah origins, retained so little visible African influence in their practice that John Hackshaw was able to give a different view of the Baptists in the north of the country:

The faith expanded to Barbados in 1957 as the Sons of God Apostolic Spiritual Baptists movement. It now ranks as one of two indigenous religions in the country, the other being the Rastafari religion. Archbishop Granville Williams, who was born in Barbados, lived for 16 years in Trinidad and Tobago, where he witnessed the local Spiritual Baptists. Becoming enthusiastic about the Trinidadian movement, he asserted that he had seen a vision and heard the voice of God. Upon returning to Barbados he held the first open-air meeting in Oistins, Christ Church. Due to a well received response in Barbados, he quickly established the Jerusalem Apostolic Spiritual Baptist Church in Ealing Grove. This church was quickly followed by Zion at Richmond Gap. As of 1999 the following in Barbados had reached around 1,900 and the Jerusalem church had been rebuilt to seat 3,000.

Name 
The local name of the Spiritual Baptist in Trinidad are called the Shouters which derives from the characteristic practice of the religion. Followers are very vocal in singing, praying, and preaching. However, shouter is seen as a derogatory term and the term spiritual is preferred due to the practice of invoking the Holy Spirit during worship.

The local name of the Spiritual Baptist in St Vincent are called the shakers due to their practice of invoking the Holy Spirit during their praise and worship.

Religious focus 
The activities of the Spiritual Baptists in Trinidad and Tobago were prohibited in 1917 by the Shouter Prohibition Ordinance, which was eventually repealed in 1951. The late opposition parliamentarian Ashford Sinanan moved to repeal the ordinance under the PNM government and was successful. Today Spiritual Baptists can practise their religion freely. The United National Congress granted them a national holiday and also gave them land on which to establish their headquarters.

Typical attire 
The colours of the headdress or clothes vary and represent the 'spiritual cities', the saints with which the individual most relates, or various qualities of belief.

Males 
Men can wear a headwrap however the very top of the head is usually left uncovered. Men tend to wear a gown or short cassocks. Persons of higher rank (Shepherds, Reverends, Bishops, etc.) can wear a surplice over the gown.

Females 

Holiday 
In 1996 the Government of Trinidad and Tobago granted a public holiday to the Spiritual Baptist faith, to be celebrated on 30 March, called Spiritual Baptist/Shouter Liberation Day, in memory of the struggle and in recognition of the repeal of the prohibition law. Trinidad and Tobago is the only country that celebrates a public holiday for the Spiritual Baptist faith.

Shango Baptists 
Shango Baptists was created in Trinidad and only practiced in Trinidad. It has no relation to the spiritual baptist religion. Shango is the practice of the Trinidad Orisha religion. In Trinidad, Orisha is also called Shango, and the term "Shango Baptist" is sometimes used to describe worshipers who are involved with both Spiritual Baptism and Orisha/Shango. The term "Shango Baptist" has come to have negative connotations for some worshippers of both Spiritual Baptism and Orisha/Shango, who argue that those who say "Shango Baptist" conflate the two religions, when in fact they are completely separate religions. As some have said, "There is no thing as Shango Baptist. Shango is Shango. Baptist is Baptist". Others say that Shango Baptists simply "wear two hats"; their mixture of "Baptist and Orisha practices" is a result of similar oppression by colonial authorities in Trinidad.

In practice, the Trinidad Orisha religion is not connected with the Spiritual Baptisms. Orisha worship services are not similar to and not held at the same locations as Spiritual Baptist churches.

Places of worship of Spiritual Baptist

Grenada 
 Children Of The Light Spiritual Baptist International Archdiocese Inc. (La Sagesse St. David's)
 Mt. Paran S.B. Church (Grand Anse Vally)
 Faith Deliverance S.B. Church (Woodlands)
 Mt. Calvary S.B. Church (River Road)
 Mt. Olive S.B. Church (Prospect)
 Mt. Zion S.B. Church (Mt. Rodney)
 Rock In The Weary Land S.B. Church (Coals Gap)
 St Ann's Mystical Healing Chapel (Marigot, St John)

Barbados 
 The Cathedral Church of Jerusalem – Ealing Grove, Christ Church
 Beulah Temple – Bishops, St. Lucy
 Zion Apostolic Temple – Richmond Gap, St. Michael
 Jeremiah Spiritual Baptist Church, Enterprise Main Road, Christ Church

Canada 
 Sacred Heart Spiritual Baptist Church in Montreal, Quebec
 The Shouters National Evangelical Spiritual Baptist Faith International Centre (NESBF) in Toronto, Ontario
 St. Theresa's Well of Life Spiritual Baptist Tabernacle Inc
 The Council of Spiritual Baptist Elders of Canada

Saint Vincent and the Grenadines 
 Mt. Olivet S.B. Church, (Layou)
 St, Bethel S.B. Church, (Mt. Carmel)
 St. Joseph S.B. Church
 St. Mary's S.B. Church

Trinidad and Tobago 
 Holy Faith Spiritual Baptist Tabernacle
 Faith International Baptist Convention
 St. Benedict Baptist Church, La Romaine
 St. Peter's House of Prayer, Morvan

United States 
 Ark of the Covenant Spiritual Baptist Church – Dorchester, Boston, Massachusetts
 Angels of the New Jerusalem S.B.C. – Baltimore, Maryland
 Bethlehem Church – Brooklyn, New York City, New York
 House of Esther Divine Ministries S.B.C; Brooklyn, New York City, New York 
Spirit Divine House of Melchizedek International S.C.Inc. Brooklyn New York 
 Mt. Pisgah S.B.C – Dorchester, Boston, Massachusetts
 Pillar of Fire Church – Dorchester, Boston, Massachusetts
 Sacred Heart of Jesus International S.B.C. – Washington, D.C.
 Scarlet Cord Cathedral – New Bedford, Massachusetts
 St. John's S.B.C – Brooklyn, New York City, New York
 St. Catherine #2 S.B.C. – Brooklyn, New York City, New York
 United Congregation El Behel – Brooklyn, New York City, New York
 Zion Apostolic S.B.C – Hyde Park, Boston, Massachusetts
Rock of Ages Spiritual Baptist Church(Lithonia Georgia)Panola Road

United Kingdom 
 Mt Moriah S.B.C. London (UK)

See also 
 Orisha
 Pentecostalism#Baptism with the Holy Spirit
 Religion in Trinidad and Tobago

References

Further reading 
 Spiritual Baptist Liberation Day, Trinidad and Tobago National Library and Information System Authority (NALIS). 
 Glazier, Stephen D. (ed.), Encyclopedia of African and African-American Religions, Routledge, 2001.
 Shepherd, King. 5 Aug 2014. The Rituals & Rudiments of the Spiritual Baptist Church - The Apostle of Faith, Interview, Youtube.com
 Duncan, Carol B. This Spot of Ground: the Spiritual Baptists in Toronto. Wilfrid Laurier University Press, 2008. 
 Gall, Timothy L. (ed). Worldmark Encyclopedia of Culture & Daily Life: Vol. 2 - Americas. Cleveland, Ohio: Eastword Publications Development (1998); pp. 76–77.
 Glazier, Stephen D. Marching the Pilgrims Home: Leadership and Decision-Making in an Afro Baptist Faith Westport, CT: Greenwood Press, 1983.
 Glazier, Stephen D. 1999. "The Noise of Astonishment: Spiritual Baptist Music in Context", in John W. Pulis (ed.), Religion, Diaspora, and Cultural Identity: A Reader in the  Anglophone Caribbean, New York and Amsterdam: Gordon and Breach, pp. 277–294.
 Glazier, Stephen D. 1996. "Changes in the Spiritual Baptist Religion, 1976-1990", in Manfred Kremser (ed.), Ay BoBo: Afro-Caribbean Cults: Identity and Resistance. Teil 1: Kulte. Wien: Institut fur Volkerkunde der Universitat Wien, pp. 107–114. 
 Glazier, Stephen D. 1993. "Responding to the Anthropologist: When the Spiritual Baptists of Trinidad Read What I Write About Them", in Caroline B. Brettell (ed.), When They Read What We  Write: The Politics of Ethnography. New York: Bergin and Garvey, pp. 37–48.
 Keeney, Bradford. Shakers of St. Vincent. Philadelphia, Pennsylvania: Ringing Rocks Press, 2002.
 Scott, Caroline 1999. Insight Guide Barbados. Discovery Channel and Insight Guides; fourth edition, Singapore, p. 85, .
 Zane, Wallace W. 1999. Journeys to the Spiritual Lands: the Natural History of a West Indian Religion. New York: Oxford University Press, 1999.

External links 
 Saint Vincent and the Grenadines
 West Indian United Spiritual Baptist Sacred Order
 Spiritual Baptist Foundation of Trinidad and Tobago
 Spiritual Baptists in Trinidad and Tobago
 Cult Music of Trinidad - a 1961 album of music by the Shango and Spiritual Baptist followers in Trinidad. Free downloadable liner notes and music clips
 Spiritual Baptist Music of Trinidad 1981 - album and free downloadable liner notes and music clips

Afro-American religion
Indigenous Christianity
Christian new religious movements
Religious groups in Trinidad and Tobago
Christianity and religious syncretism
Baptist denominations in North America